Windell Land District is a land district (cadastral division) of Western Australia and a subdivision of the North-West Land Division. It contains Newman, Paraburdoo and the former town of Wittenoom.

References

	

Land districts of Western Australia